Campbell County Comprehensive High School is a public high school in Jacksboro, Tennessee, United States. It was established in 1975 and is part of the Campbell County Public Schools district.

History 
The school began operation in 1975, serving the populations formerly served by separate high schools in Jacksboro and LaFollette. Initially it enrolled grades 10–12; grade 9 was added in the 1983–84 school year.

2005 shooting 

On November 8, 2005, student Kenneth Bartley Jr. shot and killed assistant principal Ken Bruce and wounded two other school administrators after they confronted him about having a gun in the school.

References

External links 
 

Public high schools in Tennessee
Schools in Campbell County, Tennessee
Educational institutions established in 1975
1975 establishments in Tennessee